Loma Grande may refer to:
 Loma Grande District, in Paraguay
 Loma Grande, Mexico
 Loma Grande (borough), in Merlo, Buenos Aires

See also
 Loma (disambiguation)
 Grande (disambiguation)